El Paraíso is a municipality in the Chalatenango of El Salvador. El Paraiso has many towns, including El Arenal, La Angostura, El Desvio, Santa Bárbara, Calle Nueva, El tamarindo, and Coyotera. El Paraíso has one of three natural reservation of department Chalatenango is located in El arenal. El Paraiso has two rivers: El Rio Grande, and El rio de la Arenal. A massacre of 8 Dutch journalists and FMLN guerrillas occurred near El Paraíso on 17 March 1982.

References

Municipalities of the Chalatenango Department